Shah Alamgir (died 28 February 2019) was a Bangladeshi journalist. He served as the Director General of Press Institute of Bangladesh. He joined the post on 7 July 2013. Before joining PIB, he worked as a journalist.

Birth and family identity 
Alamgir was born in Brahmanbaria district. Due to his father's job, he spent a large part of his life in greater Mymensingh.

Education life 
He passed HSC from Gauripur College, Mymensingh. Later, he completed his graduation and post-graduation in Bangla literature from University of Dhaka. He also completed his higher degree course of journalism from the Moscow Institute of Journalism, conducted by Thomson Foundation.

Career 
Alamgir's journalism career started from his student life. He started his career through joining the first child-teen weekly Kishore Bangla. He worked as the co-editor there from 1980 to 1984. Then he worked at Dainik Janata, Banglar Bani, Daily Azad and Daily Sangbad. He was involved with the Prothom Alo from November 1998 to September 2001, where he served as the joint editor. Then he began working in television, starting with Channel I as Chief News Editor, then Ekushey Television as Head of News, Jamuna Television as Director (News), and Maasranga Television as Head of News. Along with these, Alamgir served as the President and General Secretary of Dhaka Union of Journalists. He was also the President of Children's Welfare Council and Children's National Institutes ChaderHat. He was a member of the board of directors of Bangladesh Shishu Academy. He was President of "Bangladesh Shishu Kallayan Parishad" from January 2006 to December 2018 i.e. for 12 years. Prior to joining PIB, he served as the chief executive officer and Chief Editor of Asian Television.

Awards 
 Poet Abu Jafar Obaidullay literature award, 2006
 Chandraboti gold medal, 2005
 Rotary Dhaka South vocational excellence award, 2004
 Cumilla youth samity award, 2004
 Rotary International Life Achievement award, 2016

References 

2019 deaths
University of Dhaka alumni
Bangladeshi journalists
Bangladeshi male writers
People from Brahmanbaria district
1957 births